Pavel Karnaukhov (born 15 March 1997) is a Belarusian-born Russian professional ice hockey forward for CSKA Moscow of the Kontinental Hockey League.

Playing career
He was selected in the fifth round, 136th overall, in the 2015 NHL Entry Draft by the Calgary Flames.

International play

On 23 January 2022, Karnaukhov was named to the roster to represent Russian Olympic Committee athletes at the 2022 Winter Olympics.

Career statistics

Regular season and playoffs

International

Awards and honors

References

External links
 

1997 births
Living people
Belarusian ice hockey players
Calgary Flames draft picks
Calgary Hitmen players
HC CSKA Moscow players
Russian ice hockey left wingers
Ice hockey players at the 2022 Winter Olympics
Medalists at the 2022 Winter Olympics
Olympic silver medalists for the Russian Olympic Committee athletes
Olympic medalists in ice hockey
Olympic ice hockey players of Russia
Ice hockey people from Minsk